Gernot Plassnegger (born 23 March 1978) is an Austrian football coach and a former player.

Coaching career
On 4 September 2019 he left SC Austria Lustenau by mutual consent.

References

External links
 
 Gernot Plassnegger Interview

1978 births
Living people
Austrian footballers
Austria international footballers
Austrian expatriate footballers
Association football defenders
FC Hansa Rostock players
Grazer AK players
FK Austria Wien players
SV Waldhof Mannheim players
1. FC Saarbrücken players
VfL Wolfsburg players
SK Rapid Wien players
Ergotelis F.C. players
Austrian Football Bundesliga players
Bundesliga players
2. Bundesliga players
Super League Greece players
Expatriate footballers in Greece
Austrian football managers
SC Austria Lustenau managers
Grazer AK managers
People from Leoben
SV Austria Salzburg players
SK Austria Kärnten players
FC Admira Wacker Mödling players
Footballers from Styria